George King (1870 – 1 July 1916) was a Scottish professional footballer who played as a wing half in the Football League for Burnley.

Personal life 
King served as a private in the Northumberland Fusiliers during the First World War and was killed on the first day of the Somme in 1916. He is commemorated on the Thiepval Memorial.

References

Scottish footballers
Association football wing halves
Sunderland Albion F.C. players
Burnley F.C. players
Millwall F.C. players
English Football League players
Sportspeople from Dunblane
1870 births
1916 deaths
Military personnel from Stirling
Southern Football League players
British Army personnel of World War I
British military personnel killed in the Battle of the Somme
Royal Northumberland Fusiliers soldiers
Footballers from Stirling (council area)